Shahed Ahmed (born 13 September 1985) is an English footballer who plays as a striker for Sporting Bengal United.

Background
Ahmed was born in Tower Hamlets, East London, and is of Bangladeshi descent.

Playing career
After beginning as a youth player at Wimbledon, Ahmed signed a professional contract with Wycombe Wanderers in 2004. He made four appearances in The Football League for Wycombe, scoring one goal in the 2–0 victory against Kidderminster Harriers in August 2004. He also made one appearance in other competitions, before leaving in 2005.

Ahmed later played non-league football with Wingate & Finchley, where he made 17 league appearances.

Ahmed's Bangladeshi roots and British residency, means that he can play for either Bangladesh or England. In January 2010, he was targeted by the Bangladesh Football Federation to represent Bangladesh at the 2010 South Asian Games; he was unable to do so due to his exams.

In February 2011, Ahmed joined Sporting Bengal United in the Essex Senior Football League, where he later became club captain.

Personal life
In 2004, at the time of his move to Wycombe, Ahmed commented: "You do not see too many Asian players in football because they need to make a breakthrough. Other sports, such as cricket and squash, are more popular with the Asian community and parents do not encourage their children to play and watch football."

Ahmed is Muslim and fasts during Ramadan. He also changes his diet and adapts his training around his fasting.

References

External links

1985 births
Living people
English Muslims
English people of Bangladeshi descent
British Asian footballers
English footballers
Association football forwards
Wimbledon F.C. players
Wycombe Wanderers F.C. players
Wingate & Finchley F.C. players
Sporting Bengal United F.C. players
English Football League players
Footballers from East Ham